Don Alvarado (born José Ray Paige, November 4, 1904 – March 31, 1967) was an American actor, assistant director and film production manager.

Life and career
Born Jose Paige in Albuquerque, New Mexico, Alvarado first studied agriculture on his father's sheep and cattle ranch. In 1922, at just age 18 he ran away from home and went to Los Angeles, hoping to find acting work in the fledgling silent film industry. He secured work in a sweet factory before getting into the films working as an extra. 

While in Los Angeles, he became close friends with the México-born actor, Luis Antonio Dámaso de Alonso, who would later be known as Gilbert Roland. The struggling young actors shared a place for a time. Alvarado soon met and fell in love with aspiring actress, sixteen-year-old Ann Boyar, the daughter of Russian Jewish immigrants. They married in 1924.  Later that year they had a daughter, actress Joy Page.

Studio head, Jack L. Warner, fell in love with Ann and  convinced her to file for divorce from Alvarado using what used to be called a "quickie divorce" conveniently available in Mexico. She did so by August 1932. She moved in with Warner perhaps as early as September 1933 and married him in 1936. 

In 1932, Alvarado was briefly engaged to the musical-comedy star Marilyn Miller, but the marriage did not take place. 

As for his professional career, Alvarado got his first uncredited silent film part in the 1924 film, Mademoiselle Midnight. With the studio capitalizing on his "Latin Lover" looks, Alvarado was quickly cast in secondary and then leading roles. With the advent of talkies, this all but ended his starring roles. He did, however, manage to work regularly, usually cast in secondary Spanish character roles, such as in the 1929 Thornton Wilder adaptation of The Bridge of San Luis Rey. Alvarado appeared on stage in Dinner At Eight at the Belasco Theatre in Los Angeles in 1933.

In 1939, using the name "Don Page" for screen credit purposes, he began working as an assistant director for Warner Bros. and a few years later as a production manager. In these capacities he was part of the team that made a number of highly successful films including The Treasure of the Sierra Madre  (1948), East of Eden and Rebel Without a Cause in 1955, and in 1958 his final film work, The Old Man and the Sea.

Death
Alvarado died of cancer on March 31, 1967, aged 62, in Hollywood, Los Angeles, California and was interred in the Forest Lawn Memorial Park Cemetery in Hollywood Hills.

For his contributions to the film industry, Alvarado has a motion pictures star on the Hollywood Walk of Fame at 6504 Hollywood Boulevard.

Filmography

Mademoiselle Midnight (1924) - Dancer at Fiesta (uncredited) (unbilled)
The Spaniard (1925) - Matador (uncredited)
The Wife Who Wasn't Wanted (1925) - Theo
Satan in Sables (1925) - Student
The Pleasure Buyers (1925) - Tommy Wiswell
His Jazz Bride (1926)
The Night Cry (1926) - Pedro
A Hero of the Big Snows (1926) - Ed Nolan
The Monkey Talks (1927) - Sam Wick
The Loves of Carmen (1927) - José
Breakfast at Sunrise (1927) - Lussan
Drums of Love (1928) - Count Leonardo de Alvia
No Other Woman (1928) - Maurice
The Scarlet Lady (1928) - Prince Nicholas
The Battle of the Sexes (1928) - Babe Winsor
Driftwood (1928) - Jim Curtis
The Apache (1928) - Pierre Dumont
The Bridge of San Luis Rey (1929) - Manuel
Rio Rita (1929) - Roberto Ferguson
The Bad One (1930) - The Spaniard
Estrellados (1930) - Larry Mitchell
Captain Thunder (1930) - Juan
To oneiron tou glyptou (1930)
Forever Yours (1930)
Free and Easy (1930)
Beau Ideal (1931) - Ramon Gonzales
Reputation (1931)
Lady with a Past (1932) - Carlos Santiagos
The Bachelor's Affairs (1932) - Ramon Alvarez
La Cucuracha (1932)
The King Murder (1932) - Jose Moreno
Contraband (1933)
Black Beauty (1933) - Renaldo
Morning Glory (1933) - Pepi Velez
Under Secret Orders (1933) - Don Frederico
Red Wagon (1933) - Davey Heron
On Secret Service (1933) - Conte Valenti
No Sleep on the Deep (1934, Short) - Prince Enrico
Demon for Trouble (1934) - Golinda
Once to Every Bachelor (1934) - Rocco
Sweet Adeline (1934) - Renaldo (uncredited)
The Devil is a Woman (1935) - Morenito
I Live for Love (1935) - Rico Cesaro
Rosa DeFrancia (1935) - El marqués de Magny
Rose of the Rancho (1936) - Don Luis Espinosa
Federal Agent (1936) - Armand Recard
Rio Grande Romance (1936) - Jack Carter
Put on the Spot (1936) - Jack Carter (archive footage)
Nobody's Baby (1937) - Tony Cortez
The Lady Escapes (1937) - Antonio
Love Under Fire (1937) - Lieutenant Cabana
Rose of the Rio Grande (1938) - Don Jose del Torre
A Trip to Paris (1938) - Gigolo (uncredited)
Cafe Society (1939) - Don Jose Monterico (uncredited)
One Night in the Tropics (1940) - Rudolfo
The Treasure of the Sierra Madre (1948)
The Big Steal (1949) - Lt. Ruiz
East of Eden (1955)
Rebel Without a Cause (1955)
The Old Man and the Sea (1958) - Waiter (uncredited) (final film role)

References

External links

 
 
 
 Don Alvarado at Virtual History

1904 births
1967 deaths
20th-century American male actors
Male actors from Albuquerque, New Mexico
American male silent film actors
Male actors from New Mexico
Deaths from cancer in California
Burials at Forest Lawn Memorial Park (Hollywood Hills)
Unit production managers